Yarj (also Romanized as Yaraj; also known as Yarg) is a village in Jolgah Rural District, in the Central District of Jahrom County, Fars Province, Iran. At the 2006 census, its population was 793, in 173 families.

References 

Populated places in Jahrom County